Abdollahi-ye Olya (also Romanized as ‘Abdollāhī-ye ‘Olyā; also known as ‘Abdollāhī-ye Bālā) is a village in Rostam-e Yek Rural District, in the Central District of Rostam County, Fars Province, Iran. At the 2006 census, its population was 597, in 137 families.

References 

Populated places in Rostam County